GeoTools is a free software (LGPL) GIS toolkit for developing standards compliant solutions.
It provides an implementation of Open Geospatial Consortium (OGC) specifications as they are developed. GeoTools is a contributor to the GeoAPI project - a vendor-neutral set of Java interfaces derived from OGC specifications - and implements a subset of those.

It is written in Java and currently is under active development. It is used by GeoServer, uDig, Geopublisher, 52N, Geomajas and many proprietary projects.

Core features 
GeoTools library supports the following core features:

 Interfaces for spatial concepts and data structures;
 JTS Topology Suite Geometry;
 Attribute, Spatial and Temporal filters matching the OGC Filter specification;
 Decoding technology (with bindings for manyGML, Filter, KML, SLD, and SE and other OGC standards).

The GeoTools library forms a stack for the core modules; with additional plugins available to support additional formats, extensions and integration options.

History
GeoTools 1 began in 1999 at the University of Leeds by James MacGill as part of his PhD project. It aimed to provide a toolkit of resources to enable the creation of interactive geographic visualization clients. GeoTools 1 was built using the Java 1.1 environment to enable the execution of applets on a wide range of clients without the need for a plugin. It was developed in a rather ad hoc manner, with new features being added as needed. GeoTools 1 was not built with any standards in mind.

GeoTools 2 began in 2002. It was a rewrite from scratch with contributions by an international group of developers. The code base has been fundamentally redesigned to take advantage of the latest Java platform and to follow OGC specifications.

GeoTools since GeoTools 1 is no longer maintained, the "2" in "GeoTools 2" was dropped in 2007 and the project name became GeoTools. The version number followed suit in 2011 with the scheduled release of "GeoTools" version 8.

Disambiguation 
Geotools and GeotoolsMT are also the names of software written specifically for processing and displaying of magnetotelluric data (MT data). The original version of this software dates back to the late 1980s, and was sold by its parent company AOA Geophysics to Fugro Geoconsulting Inc. in 2011. With the sale of Fugro's geoscience division to CGG in 2013, the code and name rights now form part of CGG. An entirely new development of Geotools has been undertaken since 2012, and this new version is actively maintained and sold to customers.

See also
Open Source Geospatial Foundation
Magnetotellurics

References

External links
GeoTools official home page

Free GIS software